Chapman Guitars is a guitar company established in 2009 by Rob Chapman, a guitarist best known for his videos on YouTube. The company claims to be the first to design its guitars "collaboratively" and the design, features and specs of new models are selected by public votes in online polls on their website.

History

The company's first production guitar was the ML-1. The ML-1 was initially limited to a run of 500 guitars, although a second batch was produced when the factory which supplied Chapman offered more at a discounted price. The ML-2 was limited to 250 pieces.

The ML-1 featured a solid mahogany Fender Stratocaster-style body, a maple neck and an ebony fingerboard. The ML-1's body and distinctive reverse-style head-stock had a simple, satin black finish. The ML-1 was priced for the entry level market when it initially retailed for £299, but the second batch allowed its price to be reduced even further to £199. The ML-1's second batch suffered from further decreased quality control, with some customers complaining of sharp/unfinished fret work and generally poor craftsmanship. To address the quality issues, Chapman Guitars outsourced the manufacturing of its guitars to World Musical Instruments located in South Korea.

References

External links
 

Guitar manufacturing companies
Musical instrument manufacturing companies of the United Kingdom